This is the discography of Korean singer Younha, active in both South Korea and Japan, which consists of twelve studio albums, five extended plays, one compilation album, and twenty-four singles.

Albums

Studio albums

Compilation albums

Extended plays

Singles

As lead artist

As featured artist

Promotional singles

Collaborations

Other charted songs

Soundtrack appearances

Other appearances

Notes

References

Discographies of South Korean artists
Pop music discographies